Batman (Dr. Thomas Wayne) is a fictional character appearing in American comic books published by DC Comics. Created by Geoff Johns (writer) and Andy Kubert (artist), he made his first appearance in  Flashpoint #1 (July 2011). He is a hardened version of Thomas Wayne seen in the alternate timeline comic Flashpoint (2011) whose son was killed instead of Martha Wayne and himself, eventually helping Barry Allen/The Flash defeat Eobard Thawne. His character returned to the main DC Universe in DC Rebirth as a revived amalgamation of his original self that was killed by Joe Chill and the Flashpoint version of Batman that was killed in "The Button", a storyline revolving around the "Smiley-face" button from Watchmen.

In the 2013 animated DCUAOM/DCAMU film Justice League: The Flashpoint Paradox, the character is voiced by Kevin McKidd. In the 2023 live-action DC Extended Universe (DCEU) film The Flash, the role of the Flashpoint iteration of Batman is replaced by that of an older alternate reality version of Bruce Wayne / Batman with Michael Keaton reprising his role from Batman (1989) and Batman Returns (1992).

Background

Flashpoint

An alternate reality version of Thomas Wayne appears as the Flashpoint version of Batman. In this continuity, Thomas turns into a crime-fighting vigilante after he and Martha Wayne witness their son Bruce Wayne murdered by a gunman in an alley during a botched mugging. When Barry Allen from the original timeline learns that this universe has a Batman he attempts to elicit his aid in restoring his lost abilities and undoing the changes made to the timeline. When Barry enters the Batcave he expects to find Bruce, but is immediately attacked by this far more violent Caped Crusader, against whom he is no match without his speedster abilities. It's only when Barry calls out the name "Bruce" that Thomas ceases his assault and the two are able to talk. When Barry learns that this timeline's Bruce Wayne was killed as a boy he is able to deduce that the man standing in front of him is Thomas Wayne. Allen reveals to this Batman that the timeline he is living in is an altered version of his own, with significant changes resulting in a much darker and more violent world. Batman asks Barry the details of his son's life after his mainstream counterpart's own death. Willing to change history and ready to sacrifice his own life to restore his son's, Batman agrees to help Barry rewrite the timeline, which they believe has been altered by Eobard Thawne (The Reverse Flash), the first step of which is recreating the accident that gave Allen his powers and turned him into The Flash.

This iteration of Batman is the subject of the mini-series Flashpoint: Batman - Knight of Vengeance, written by Brian Azzarello and drawn by Eduardo Risso. This story is set after the first, failed attempt to restore Barry's powers and fills out the backstory of how different this version of Gotham is and how Thomas operates as Batman. Thomas funds his vigilantism through a string of successful casinos, which he also uses to keep an eye on local criminals. These casinos are managed on his behalf by Oswald Cobbelpot as his security chief, while Batman fights crime. Local judge Harvey Dent is distressed when his twin children are kidnapped by the Joker, so he calls in Thomas and James Gordon who we learn is the Chief of Gotham's privatised police force, owned and funded by Wayne. Dent blames Wayne for the kidnapping as it was he who convinced him that privatising the police force was a good idea, and threatens to take both it and his casinos away if his children aren't found. Gordon, who knows Thomas is Batman and is his closest confidant, works the case while Thomas recovers from a fight with Killer Croc in Gotham's sewers. He consults with Selina Kyle, who is paraplegic in this world and fulfills the role of Oracle, and follows a clue to track down where the Joker is holding the children; The long abandoned Wayne Manor. He misleads Thomas and tries to take down Joker himself, but in a shocking twist ends up shooting Dent's daughter who the Joker had disguised to look like herself. When he realises his mistake and tries to help the girl, The Joker appears from behind him and cuts his throat. This is when we learn that this Joker is none other than Martha Wayne, driven insane by grief following Bruce's murder. Thomas cannot bring himself to kill her due to their past relationship, and so he feels responsible for the Joker's crimes. When he shows up as Batman, having learned of Gordon's plan from Selina, Gordon is already dead, but both children are still alive, the girl just about holding on. While trying to save them, he is attacked by Martha, and we see through flashbacks how her sanity slipped away following their Son's death, and how she blames Thomas and wants to punish him for failing to save him. During their fight Thomas explains to her that he has the chance to re-write history, to save their son but at the cost of both their lives, which is why he feels obligated to ask her if he should go through with it. This revelation seemingly restores Martha's sanity and she makes him promise that he will, and they share a moment as a couple again. But when Martha asks what their son becomes after their counterparts' deaths and Thomas reveals that he becomes that world's Batman, Martha hysterically flees from him, and falls to her death through the same hole that their son once fell into as a child.

After a second attempt successfully restores Barry's powers, Wayne works with the Flash to rally a team to oppose Eobard Thawne's changes to history. He contacts Cyborg for help in tracking down the government's secret "Project: Superman" location, only to be disappointed at Kal-El's frail appearance, having been held in a secret bunker his whole life with no access to the yellow sunlight that grants him his powers. It's only after they free him from captivity that Kal-El's powers manifest after being exposed to sunlight and he flies away. After escaping Project Superman with the help of Element Woman, the Flash's memories change more drastically, forcing Batman to attempt to prevent the speedster's memories from altering. Batman injects the Flash with a drug that slows down electrical activity in the brain. After Hal Jordan's death during an attempt to stop the World War between the Amazonians and Atlanteans, the Flash elects to try to save this altered world, so Batman joins the Flash as the group heads to New Themyscira in Batman's plane and are joined by Enchantress. During the final battle with both Wonder Woman and Aquaman, the battle seems to be in their team's favor until Billy Batson is killed and Eobard finally appears. Batman stabs Professor Zoom in the back using an Amazonian sword and learns that altered timeline was actually created by the Flash as part of an attempt to save his mother, Nora Allen. Before acting on this new information, Batman is fatally wounded by the traitorous Enchantress. Before the Flash leaves to try and restore the old world, a dying Batman thanks him, and entrusts him with a letter to give to his son, expressing his confidence that Barry will recreate the better world the Flash has spoken of and sharing his regret for what will happen to Nora as a consequence. Despite Pandora's actions preventing The Flash's from being able to recreate the Pre-Flashpoint timeline perfectly, Thomas's will is done as his son is alive as Batman in this New Alternate Timeline. Barry gives Thomas's letter to Bruce Wayne and tells him that the timeline could not have been restored without Thomas's help.

Thomas's letter tells Bruce that the loss he suffered has corrupted him, that he is consumed by his past and is neither a Hero or even a good man. He credits those qualities to Barry Allen, due to his ability to move past his own loss and find hope and love again, hinting perhaps that he hopes Bruce can do the same.

Convergence

In the Convergence crossover, when the alternate Brainiac miniaturized the reality of the Flashpoint universe, Thomas Wayne had returned alongside Captain Thunder, Kal-El, Abin Sur and Cyborg. Thomas prepares for war against the Pre-Flashpoint Gotham City. He ponders if this Gotham City belongs to the same world that both Flash comes from and where Bruce is alive. Thomas also mentioned that he is unsure of his being "dead" in battle and forced to fight their opposite Superman by the voice of Telos. While he watched digital renderings in the Batcave of the Pre-Flashpoint heroes against Superman, he was confronted by Kal-El asking to help the other-reality Lois Lane's pregnancy and convinces him that the other-reality heroes are not enemies. Superman arrives and pulls his counterpart elsewhere. Thomas is willing to help and successfully helps Lois give birth to their son. While leaving them content, Thomas then tells Superman that he has to protect the newborn child to which Superman agrees. Following the conclusion of the Convergence, all parallel universes and alternate timelines are restored and composed as the new multiverse, including the Flashpoint reality and thus Thomas remains existing as the result.

DC Rebirth

Subsequently, in DC Rebirth, Flashpoint Batman (Thomas Wayne) is mentioned by Wally West in the Batcave from the Speed Force to tell Batman (Bruce Wayne) about Thomas's letter saying how it all started and warned the Flash before the Speed Force pulled Wally away. Before Batman specified, he discovered a mysterious button embedded to the Batcave wall and pries the button out. Later, Batman and the Flash agree to keep their investigation to themselves until they knew who or what against an impending threat after the evidence of the button from outside force.

While Batman (Bruce Wayne) was still puzzled about the button, its reaction to Psycho-Pirate's mask summons the Flashpoint Batman (Thomas Wayne); his son slowly reaches out a hand to him, only for the Flashpoint Batman to vanish as Batman makes contact. Batman contacted the Flash about the button, but Eobard Thawne attacks Batman in the Batcave while Flash is busy. Thawne nearly kills Batman and destroys Thomas's letter as revenge for Thomas killing Thawne, provoking Batman to try and attack only to be outpaced by Thawne's speed. When Thawne picks up the button, Thawne is briefly teleported away, returning with his entire body mutilated by an impending threat that he vaguely identifies as "God" before he seemingly dies.

After traveling on the Cosmic Treadmill, the Flash and Batman find themselves in the presence of Batman's Flashpoint "counterpart". Prior to their arrival and after the Flash left to undo the events of Flashpoint, Thomas found that the Flashpoint timeline was not erased yet as the Flash intended, and instead was forced to live out the remainder of Aquaman and Wonder Woman's war. Left to ponder in the Batcave, Thomas waited for the joint Atlantean and Amazonian hit squad to arrive so he may sacrifice himself and them with explosives, until he encounters the Flash and Batman. He believes the two are hallucinations until the Flash briefs him on their situation.

Thomas teams up with his son to hold off the Atlantean-Amazonian hit squad to give the Flash time to fix the Cosmic Treadmill. The two Batmen reminisce about their first visit to the cave, and Thomas learns from Batman that he has a grandson. As soon as the Flash finished the repairs, Batman pleads with Thomas to come with him. Despite his desire to be with his son again, Thomas pushes Batman onto the Cosmic Treadmill, imploring the latter to find happiness and be the father to his son that Thomas could never be for him, and to let 'the Batman' die with him. As the Flash and Batman disappear, Thomas is satisfied upon seeing his son alive and accepts his fate; he hopes that Bruce would move on from the past. He throws his explosive trigger away and puts his cowl back on, reminiscing about the inspiring words he gave to Bruce as a child, and jumping into the white void that is erasing the Flashpoint universe with his last words being "We rise".

Despite this, Thomas is later revealed to have been saved by Reverse-Flash, appearing in the main timeline in an alliance with Bane; he was first shown appearing alongside the other villains in Arkham Asylum after the failed wedding between Catwoman and his son. His stated goal was to break his son's will as Batman, through methods such as psychically convincing Catwoman to end her relationship with Bruce, so that Bruce would abandon his life as Batman as Thomas wished. Once he judged Bruce to be suitably psychologically broken, he broke into the Batcave, knocked out Alfred, and trapped his son in a nightmarish sequence in Arkham Asylum. Once Bruce escaped, Thomas met him directly with the offer of restoring Martha to life so that they could be a family again, but Bruce rejected this offer, proclaiming that his father failed to understand that his goal as Batman was to hope for the future. Returning to Gotham after apparently defeating his son, Thomas set out to reconstruct the city in his image, using the Psycho-Pirate to convert the city's villains into his enforcers, but Alfred- who Thomas had left mentally free but imprisoned at Wayne Manor as an apparent hostage to prevent retaliation from Batman's allies- informed Thomas that his son was going to destroy him when he finally returned to Gotham. Thomas maintains control using Gotham Girl as his enforcer and the Psycho-Pirate to moderate the villains, issuing orders that any heroes entering Gotham will be expelled while villains would be contained, to the point that Gotham Girl is able to defeat Captain Atom when he tries to confront her.

After Batman defeated Bane with Catwoman's assistance, Thomas betrays the villain by shooting him in the head, leaving him comatose. Holding the gun to Bruce, Thomas tries to convince his son to give up being a vigilante and live a long and happy life with Selina. When he rejects this offer, Bruce manages to subdue Thomas, explaining that Thomas is not his real father before knocking him out. While in prison, Bane took his revenge against Thomas by breaking his back.

Infinite Frontier
In the pages of "Infinite Frontier", Thomas was transferred to Arkham Asylum where he recovered from his injuries. He was abducted from Arkham Asylum by X-Tract and taken to their inter-dimensional prison ship. He escaped in a capsule that landed on Earth 23. Thomas was found by the unnamed adoptive parents of Calvin Ellis, this world's Superman, where they handed him over to Calvin. They were attacked by Magog when trying to investigate the crashed ship as Magog claims to them that he wants to keep the dangers of the Multiverse off his world. After talking down Magog and getting the Justice Incarnate to stand down, Thomas and Calvin find that the ship came from Earth 23. As Thomas and Calvin travel to Earth 23, Calvin suspects that Lex Luthor was responsible and fight their way through his defenses. While Thomas claims to Calvin that his jobs keep him from having a family, Calvin states that he should make up with this son only for Thomas to tell Calvin that he hurt his son too much. By the time they reached Lex Luthor, they find him dead with his heart ripped out. Returning from Earth 23, Thomas and Calvin find Machinehead rebuilding the crashed ship as it is suspected that Lex Luthor had help from someone in another part of the Multiverse. Looking up the records of the alternate Batmen, Thomas realizes that being a hero is Bruce's destiny. Machinehead then attacks the Justice Incarnate with plans to keep the parts of the Multiverse separate from each other. During the fight on Earth Omega, Thomas assists Calvin in taking down Machinehead and later becomes a member of the Justice Incarnate.

Flashpoint Beyond
When Bruce Wayne enlisted Mime and Marionette to steal the snowglobe containing the Flashpoint reality from Rip Hunter sometime after Thomas had faded, the Flashpoint was restarted where the Atlantean and Amazon war was made worse, Super-Man was released from his capsule earlier by Batman, and there are claims of threats from space coming to Earth. During this time, Thomas takes in Harvey Dent's son Dexter after Harvey was killed and Gilda was locked up in Arkham Asylum. After Barry Allen was murdered when Batman was trying to get him speed powers through the same accident as the main Flash, he starts to investigate his murder where Aquaman denied sending Scavenger to sabotage the experiment. After being unable to help Super-Man with preparing for the Kryptonian invasion, Batman finds that Eobard Thawne was found dead. He starts putting together the clock parts he found in Thawne's corpse. Having followed Dexter Dent to Arkham Asylum, Batman finds that the Clockwork Killer is Martha who survived her fall. She has been using some scientists to build a Time Sphere and gutted them after they have served their purpose. With the Time Sphere, Martha plans to make it so that Bruce survives and she and Thomas didn't after learning about the other timeline from a displaced Psycho-Pirate who she killed. After the Time Sphere exploded and Gilda was killed, Batman's gamble with Rip Hunter came out positive as both Thomas and Martha accepted that the world would be better without Bruce enabling the Flashpoint reality to be stabilized. With Joker locked up in the Batcave, Batman takes Dexter in as Robin as Commissioner Gigante lights the Bat-Signal in light of the Kryptonian fleet arriving.

Other versions

Original depiction

In other media

Film
In the 2023 DC Extended Universe (DCEU) film The Flash, a loose adaptation of Flashpoint, the role of the Flashpoint iteration of Batman is replaced by that of Bruce Wayne / Batman, an older alternate reality version of Batman portrayed by Michael Keaton, reprising his role from Batman (1989) and Batman Returns (1992). In earlier drafts of the film's screenplay, Jeffrey Dean Morgan was intended to reprise his role as Thomas Wayne (as Batman) from Batman v Superman: Dawn of Justice (2016).

Video games
 The Flashpoint iteration of Batman's outfit appears as an alternate skin for Bruce Wayne / Batman in Injustice: Gods Among Us.
 The Flashpoint version of Batman's outfit is available as downloadable content (DLC) for Bruce Wayne / Batman in Batman: Arkham Knight.

Other media
 The Flashpoint iteration of Batman appears in the DCUAOM/DCAMU film Justice League: The Flashpoint Paradox (2013), voiced by Kevin McKidd. This version's storyline plays out similarly to the comics version, though he fatally shoots Eobard Thawne instead of stabbing him.
 The Flashpoint iteration of Batman makes a non-speaking cameo appearance in Suicide Squad: Hell to Pay, revealing how Thawne survived.
 In the Arrowverse television series The Flash, the Earth-2 version of Robert Queen (portrayed by Jamey Sheridan) is depicted as having become a murderous Green Arrow after the death of his son Oliver Queen (the Earth-1 Green Arrow), in reference to the Flashpoint iteration of Batman.

References

Further reading
 
 
 
 
 
 
 
 

Comics characters introduced in 2011
DC Comics male superheroes
DC Comics martial artists
Alternative versions of Batman
Fictional blade and dart throwers
Fictional business executives
Fictional gunfighters in comics
Fictional physicians
Fictional socialites
Fictional surgeons
Superhero film characters
Vigilante characters in comics